No Sun in Venice is a 1957 French-Italian drama film directed by Roger Vadim. It was entered into the 7th Berlin International Film Festival. The soundtrack for the film was composed by pianist John Lewis, and performed by the Modern Jazz Quartet. The soundtrack album was released in 1957 on Atlantic.

Cast
 Françoise Arnoul as Sophie
 Christian Marquand as Michel Lafaurie
 Robert Hossein as Sforzi
 O. E. Hasse as Eric von Bergen
 Franco Fabrizi as Busetti
  as Bernard
 Carlo Delle Piane as Jeannot
  as Inspecteur
 Lila Rocco as Lisa
 Margaret Rung as Comtesse
 Christian Cazau as Coco
 Venantino Venantini
 Daniel Emilfork

Production
The film was made by Roger Vadim and producer Raoul Levy, who had just made And God Created Woman which was yet to be released. It was based on an unpublished novel Vadim had written a few years before. Levy had it relocated from Paris to Italy and cast Francoise Arnoul as he did not want to risk casting Brigitte Bardot in case And God Created Woman was not a success.

References

External links

1957 films
1957 drama films
CinemaScope films
French drama films
Italian drama films
Films directed by Roger Vadim
Films scored by John Lewis
1950s French films
1950s Italian films